Point Beach Ridges is a  topography of alternating ridges and swales in Manitowoc County, Wisconsin. The area is located within Point Beach State Forest. It was designated a Wisconsin State Natural Area in 1971 and a National Natural Landmark in 1980.

References

Protected areas of Manitowoc County, Wisconsin
National Natural Landmarks in Wisconsin
State Natural Areas of Wisconsin